Traci Harding (born 1964) is an Australian novelist. Her work blends fantasy, fact, esoteric belief, time travel and quantum physics, into adventurous romps through history, alternative dimensions, universes and states of consciousness.

She was born and raised in Carlingford, a western suburb of Sydney, New South Wales. Harding states that her early interests were, "music, boys, daydreaming and storytelling".  After leaving school she first pursued an interest in music, and then worked in film studio management for several years where she wrote and developed film scripts, and later began writing novels.

Works

Novels
The Ancient Future trilogy
The Ancient Future: The Dark Age (1996)
An Echo in Time: Atlantis (1997)
Masters of Reality: The Gathering (1998)
The Alchemist's Key (1999)
The Celestial Triad
Chronicle of Ages (2000)
Tablet of Destinies (2001)
Cosmic Logos (2002)
Ghostwriting (2002) (short stories)
The Book of Dreams (2003) 
The Mystique Trilogy
Gene of Isis (2005)
The Dragon Queens (2007)
The Black Madonna (2008)
Triad of Being Trilogy
Being of the Field (2009)
The Universe Parallel (2010)
The Light-Field (2012 - February)
The Timekeepers (trilogy)
Dreaming of Zhou Gong (February 2013)
The Eternity Gate (January 2014)
AWOL' (February 2015) The Storytellers Muse (2016) The Immortal Bind (2017)This Present Past (2018) (prequel to The Ancient Future'' trilogy)

References

 Traci Harding HarperCollins Publishers New Zealand, (Retrieved 28-July-2007)

External links
Traci Harding's Website
All Things Traci - Autographed Books
Traci Harding Merchandise  
Traci Harding Fans on Facebook

Traci Harding on Patreon

1964 births
Living people
Australian fantasy writers
Australian women novelists
Writers from Sydney
20th-century Australian novelists
20th-century Australian women writers
21st-century Australian women writers
21st-century Australian writers
Women science fiction and fantasy writers